Correll's Farm and Lawn Supply is a historic commercial building located at Kirkwood, New Castle County, Delaware.  It was built about 1885, and is a two-story, braced frame board-and-batten commercial building with a low gable roof.  There is an attached one-story metal shed.  It was originally built as a freight storage depot of the Delaware Railroad.

It was added to the National Register of Historic Places in 1982.

References

Commercial buildings on the National Register of Historic Places in Delaware
Commercial buildings completed in 1885
Buildings and structures in New Castle County, Delaware
National Register of Historic Places in New Castle County, Delaware